Helen Willetts is a meteorologist on the BBC. She appears regularly on BBC News, BBC World News, BBC Red Button, BBC Radio 4, BBC Radio 5 Live and BBC Radio 2. Willetts is an occasional weather forecaster on the BBC News at Ten on BBC One.

Early life
Willetts was born in Chester, England. She was educated at Ysgol Eirias (Eirias High School) in Colwyn Bay, Wales. She obtained a first class honours degree in Physics at the University of Nottingham in 1993.

In February 1994, Willetts joined the Met Office to begin a five-month weather forecaster training course at the Met Office College based at the former RAF Shinfield Park.

Broadcasting career   
In July 1994, Willetts moved to the Weather Centre in Cardiff. From 1995, she was a forecaster on both BBC Television and BBC Radio in Wales.

In 1997, she joined BBC Weather in London to work for BBC News.

Awards
In March 2006, she was awarded the Television and Radio Industry Club (TRIC) award for best TV weather presenter.

Personal life
Helen played badminton internationally for Wales. She enjoys walking, cycling and travelling.

References

1972 births
Living people
Alumni of the University of Nottingham
BBC weather forecasters
BBC World News
People from Chester
People from Colwyn Bay
Welsh female badminton players
Sportspeople from Cheshire
English meteorologists